Thuraimugam is a 1996 Tamil-language  crime drama film directed by K. Rajeshwar. The film stars C. Arunpandian and Shobana, with Livingston, Alex, Poornam Viswanathan, Charle, Jai Ganesh and Kavitha playing supporting roles. It was released on 25 October 1996.

Plot

Naamam (Jai Ganesh) was a union leader respected by the labourers, he lived with his wife Punniyalakshmi (Kavitha) and two children in abject poverty. He even went on hunger strike over a salary dispute. The last day of the hunger strike, he was poisoned by his friend Ethiraj (Alex) and thus Ethiraj became the new union leader. Punniyalakshmi and her children suffered hunger, thus her baby girl died. Punniyalakshmi, with her child Johnny into her arms, jumped into the sea. They were later saved by labourers and admitted at the hospital. There, Johnny ran away from his mother.

Many years later, Johnny (C. Arunpandian) became a gangster in a port city. Johnny had met his mother but he still hated her and he preferred to maintain the distance between them. The police Inspector Alexander Veeramuthu (Georgi George) waited for the right moment to arrest Johnny. Johnny was the friend of the transsexual Gowri Kumar (Livingston) who was Ethiraj's son. One night, Gowri Kumar killed a prostitute. Johnny was then wrongly accused with Gowri Kumar for killing the prostitute. At the court, Gowri Kumar was sentenced to life imprisonment, whereas Johnny got a seven-year prison sentence.

Seven years later, Johnny is urged to take revenge on the public prosecutor Ramanujam (Poornam Viswanathan). His first attempt to murder him fails. So he decides to spoil his daughter Rukkumani's (Shobana) life and he even stops her wedding. In the meantime, Johnny clashes with the smuggler Ethiraj. When Ethiraj's henchmen try to kill Johnny, his mother Punniyalakshmi intervenes and dies. Ethiraj then dies in a car accident. Fate leads Johnny to marry Rukkumani. Rukkumani then changes him into a good person and Johnny starts to work as a labourer in the port. All goes well until Gowri Kumar is released from jail. What transpires next forms the rest of the story.

Cast

C. Arunpandian as Johnny
Shobana as Rukkumani
Livingston as Gowri Kumar
Alex as Ethiraj
Poornam Viswanathan as Ramanujam, Rukkumani's father
Charle as Jana
Jai Ganesh as Johnny's father (guest appearance)
Kavitha as Punniyalakshmi
Georgi George as Inspector Alexander Veeramuthu
K. R. Savithri as Mangalam, Rukkumani's mother
Disco Shanti
Anusha as Radha, Rukkumani's mother
Shakeela
M. R. Krishnamurthy as Narayanan
Manager Cheena as Doctor
Master Udaya Raj as Johnny (child)
Mahendran as Alexander Veeramuthu
Nellai Kabilan as Pattakathi Paalayan
Jayamani
Vincent Roy

Soundtrack

The film score and the soundtrack were composed by Adithyan. The soundtrack, released in 1994, features 6 tracks with lyrics written by the film director K. Rajeshwar.

References

1996 films
1990s Tamil-language films
Indian crime drama films
1996 crime drama films
Indian action drama films
1990s action drama films
Films directed by K. Rajeshwar